Gerrit is a free, web-based team code collaboration tool. Software developers in a team can review each other's modifications on their source code using a Web browser and approve or reject those changes. It integrates closely with Git, a distributed version control system.

Gerrit is a fork of Rietveld, a code review tool for Subversion. Both are namesakes of Dutch designer Gerrit Rietveld.

History 

Originally written in Python like Rietveld, it is now written in Java (Java EE Servlet) with SQL since version 2 and a custom-made Git-based database (NoteDb) since version 3.

In versions 2.0–2.16 Gerrit used Google Web Toolkit for its browser-based front-end. After being developed and used in parallel with GWT for versions 2.14–2.16, a new Polymer web UI replaced the GWT UI in version 3.0.

Notable users 

 Android
 Chromium
 ChromiumOS
 coreboot
 CollabNet
 LineageOS
 Eclipse Foundation
 Ericsson
 Fuchsia
 Garmin
 gem5
 Go
 GWT
 HTC
 illumos
 Volvo Cars
 LibreOffice
 OpenStack
 Qt
 SAP SE
 Skia
 Scilab
 Tizen
 TYPO3
 TubeMogul
Qualcomm
QIWI
 Wikimedia
 Arm

 Nokia
 Yext

See also 

 List of tools for code review

References

External links 

 

Computer programming
Google software
Software review
Free software programmed in Java (programming language)